Micklefield may refer to:

Micklefield in West Yorkshire, England
Micklefield, High Wycombe, an area of High Wycombe in Buckinghamshire, England
Micklefield Green in Hertfordshire, England